Frédéric Tranchand (born 25 May 1988) is a French orienteering competitor.

He won his first medal in the relay with the French team at the 2010 European Orienteering Championships in Primorsko, coming 2nd along with teammates Philippe Adamski and Thierry Gueorgiou. The same year, he won a bronze medal in the sprint at the 2010 World Orienteering Championships in Trondheim, which at the time was deemed a major surprise.

after a 4- year period with no medals in the World Championships, Tranchand returned to the podium with medals in the relay. Tranchand received his second individual medal at the 2017 World Championships in Estonia. His silver medal in the sprint event was behind multiple world champion Daniel Hubmann.

Tranchand runs for the club OK Hällen in Stigtomta, Sweden.

References

External links
 

1988 births
Living people
French orienteers
Male orienteers
Foot orienteers
World Orienteering Championships medalists
Competitors at the 2017 World Games